Russell Mitchell (born June 1, 1942) is an American gymnast. He competed in eight events at the 1964 Summer Olympics.

References

1942 births
Living people
American male artistic gymnasts
Olympic gymnasts of the United States
Gymnasts at the 1964 Summer Olympics
Sportspeople from Phoenix, Arizona